Statistics of North American Soccer League in season 1981. This was the 14th season of the NASL.

Overview
There were a total of 21 teams participating. Three teams (Houston, Rochester and Washington) folded, while four others (Memphis, Detroit, New England and Philadelphia) moved to new cities. Playoff series were switched from the two matches plus a mini-game tiebreaker used since 1977, to a best-of-three full matches played on three separate dates. The Chicago Sting defeated the New York Cosmos in Soccer Bowl '81 on September 26 to win the championship.

When Major League Baseball players went on strike on June 12, there was speculation that other sports, especially soccer, would see larger crowds. However, the 157 NASL matches played during the baseball work stoppage (which ended August 9) drew an average attendance of only 13,419, less than the full-season average of 14,084.

Changes from the previous season

New teams
None

Teams folding
Houston Hurricane
Rochester Lancers
Washington Diplomats

Teams moving
Memphis Rogues to Calgary Boomers
Detroit Express to Washington Diplomats
New England Tea Men to Jacksonville Tea Men
Philadelphia Fury to Montreal Manic

Name changes
None

Regular season
W = Wins, L = Losses, GF = Goals For, GA = Goals Against, PT= point system

6 points for a win in regulation and overtime, 4 point for a shootout win,
0 points for a loss,
1 bonus point for each regulation goal scored, up to three per game.
-Premiers (most points). -Other playoff teams.

NASL All-Stars

Playoffs

15 teams qualified for the playoffs – each first and second-place team across the divisions plus the five next best teams. Division winners were seeded 1 through 5, the second-place teams were seeded 6 through 10, and the last five teams were seeded 11 through 15 regardless of division placing. The top seed received a bye, and the remaining 14 teams paired off to play the first round. Series winners would be reseeded by season point total after each round.

The 'best of two' format used from 1978 to 1980 was discarded for a more straightforward best of three games format in the first three rounds.

Bracket

First round
#Due to a scheduling conflict between the Calgary Boomers and the Billy Graham Crusade, the Fort Lauderdale Strikers hosted both Games 1 and 2 (instead of Game 1 only), there-by gaining home field advantage even though they were the lower seed. 
*Seattle Sounders hosted Game 2 (instead of Game 1) due to a scheduling conflict with the Mariners baseball club.

Quarterfinals

Semifinals

Soccer Bowl '81

1981 NASL Champions: Chicago Sting

*From 1977 through 1984 the NASL had a variation of the penalty shoot-out procedure for tied matches. The shoot-out started 35 yards from the goal and allowed the player 5 seconds to attempt a shot. The player could make as many moves as he wanted in a breakaway situation within the time frame. Even though this particular match was a scoreless tie after overtime, NASL procedure also called for the box score to show an additional "goal" given to the winning team.

Post season awards
Most Valuable Player: Giorgio Chinaglia, New York 
Coach of the year: Willy Roy, Chicago 
Rookie of the year: Joe Morrone, Jr., Tulsa
 North American Player of the Year:  Mike Stojanović, San Diego

References

External links
 Video of 1981 NASL goals of the year
 Complete Results and Standings

 
North American Soccer League (1968–1984) seasons
1981 in American soccer leagues
1981 in Canadian soccer